Jonathan Ring (born 5 December 1991) is a Swedish professional footballer who plays for Jeju United as a left midfielder.

Club career
On 10 May 2018, Ring scored as Djurgårdens IF beat Malmö FF 3–0 in the Swedish Cup final.

On 25 January 2022, he joined Jeju United FC of K League 1.

Personal life
Jonathan grew up in a sports-oriented family in Örebro, Närke. He is the brother of fellow footballer Sebastian Ring.

Honours

Club
Djurgårdens IF
 Allsvenskan: 2019
 Svenska Cupen: 2017–18

References

External links

   

1991 births
Living people
Sportspeople from Örebro
Swedish footballers
Association football midfielders
IFK Värnamo players
Kalmar FF players
Gençlerbirliği S.K. footballers
Djurgårdens IF Fotboll players
Jeju United FC players
Superettan players
Allsvenskan players
Süper Lig players
K League 1 players
Expatriate footballers in Turkey
Expatriate footballers in South Korea
Swedish expatriate footballers